Pavao Pervan (born 13 November 1987) is an Austrian footballer who plays as a goalkeeper for Bundesliga club VfL Wolfsburg and the  Austria national team.

Club career
Born in Livno, SR Bosnia and Herzegovina, Pervan came up through the Austrian lower leagues to finally cement his place between the sticks at Bundesliga side LASK from 2012 onwards.

International career
He was first called up for Austria national football team in November 2017, but remained on the bench in his first 10 call ups to the squad. He made his debut on 19 November 2019 in a Euro 2020 qualifier against Latvia which Austria lost 0–1. He has, as of April 2021, earned a total of 7 caps, scoring no goals.

References

External links

 Profile at the VfL Wolfsburg website
 
 
 

1987 births
Living people
People from Livno
Croats of Bosnia and Herzegovina
Austrian people of Croatian descent
Yugoslav emigrants to Austria
Association football goalkeepers
Austrian footballers
Austria international footballers
SV Schwechat players
FC Lustenau players
FC Juniors OÖ players
LASK players
VfL Wolfsburg players
Austrian Landesliga players
Austrian Regionalliga players
2. Liga (Austria) players
Austrian Football Bundesliga players
Bundesliga players
UEFA Euro 2020 players
Austrian expatriate footballers
Expatriate footballers in Germany
Austrian expatriate sportspeople in Germany
Footballers from Vienna